This is a list of notable emo rap artists.

List

 24kGoldn
 Bones
 Iann Dior
 GothBoiClique
 Hobo Johnson
 Juice WRLD
 The Kid Laroi
 Lil Aaron
 Lil Bo Weep
 Lil Lotus
 Lil Peep
 Lil Skies
 Lil Tracy
 Lil Uzi Vert
 Lil Xan 
 Lil Yachty
 Midwxst
 Night Lovell
 Nothing,Nowhere
 Poorstacy
 Princess Nokia
 Powfu
 Trippie Redd
 Wicca Phase Springs Eternal
 Wifisfuneral 
 XXXTentacion
 Yung Lean

References 

Lists of musicians by genre